Tupile may refer to:

Places:
 Tupile (town), a town in Panama
 Tupile Island, one of the Caribbean islands of Panama
 Tupile Airport, an Air Panama destination

Fiction:
 Tupile (Dune), a fictional planet in the Dune universe created by Frank Herbert